Constance Mayfield Rourke (November 14, 1885 – March 29, 1941) was an American author and educator. She was born in Cleveland, Ohio, and attended Sorbonne and Vassar College. She taught at Vassar from 1910 to 1915. She died in Grand Rapids, Michigan in 1941.

Rourke specialized in American popular culture. She wrote numerous pieces of criticism for magazines like The Nation and The New Republic. However, she made her name as a writer of biographies and biographical sketches of notable American figures, such as John James Audubon, P.T. Barnum, Lotta Crabtree, Davy Crockett, and Charles Sheeler, as well as books exploring different components of American culture and its history, of which American Humor: A Study of the National Character, first published in 1931, is the most famous. During the 1930s she worked on the Index of American Design as part of the Federal Art Project of the Works Progress Administration. Her work was essential in the formation of the scholarly fields of American Studies and American Literature. Two of her books received the Newbery Honor award.

Legacy

Rourke's work, especially American Humor, made a significant impact on the early twentieth century study of American popular culture and folk culture. From her death onwards, selections from Rourke's works were regularly anthologized.

A biography by Joan Shelley Rubin was published in 1980.

Nevertheless, Rourke's works and their apparent influence have faded significantly. Many of her books are out of print and recent anthologies, for instance of American Studies, do not mention her. However, Rourke continues to have some notable fans who make significant claims for her work and importance. Perhaps the most important work in this vein is Michael Denning's book, The Cultural Front.

The American rock critic Greil Marcus wrote an introduction to a 2004 edition of American Humor.

Most recently, on Rourke's birthday in 2011, Lucy Sante had these words to say: "CONSTANCE ROURKE (1885–1941) died — from a slip on an icy porch — way too young. If she had finished her projected five-volume Roots of American Culture, it might have synthesized all her research into a grand Key to the American Scriptures. As it is she wrote solid if unexciting books on Davy Crockett, John James Audubon, Charles Sheeler, the Beecher family, and Lotta Crabtree, "Fairy Star of the Gold Rush". But she also wrote American Humor (1931), fruit of prolonged and concentrated squinting into the mists, attempting to make out the first stirrings of an American culture that was free from second-guessing based on overseas models. Peering into the taverns and opera houses and faro parlors of the Jacksonian era she came to the conclusion that the primal scene occurred in humor. "Laughter produced the illusion of leveling obstacles in a world which was full of unaccustomed obstacles." She discerned three essential figures: the Yankee peddler, the backwoodsman, and the Negro minstrel. "Each in a fashion of his own had broken bonds ... As figures they embodied a deep-lying mood of disseverance, carrying the popular fancy further and further from any fixed or traditional heritage." She followed the three out to the frontier, riding on a wave of jokes and coinages and hoaxes and cuttings-up. The first half of the book is a breathless bravura performance; the book as a whole sits right between William Carlos Williams's in the American Grain and Thomas Pynchon's Mason & Dixon."

Books
Trumpets of Jubilee. New York: Harcourt, Brace & Company, 1927.
Troupers on the Gold Coast, or The Rise of Lotta Crabtree. New York: Harcourt, Brace & Company, 1928.
 American Humor: a Study of the National Character. 1931. Reprint. New York: Harcourt Brace Jovanovich, 1959. Reprint. New York: New York Review Books Classics, 2004. (Latter with Introduction by Greil Marcus.)
 Davy Crockett. New York: Harcourt, Brace & Company, 1934.
 Audubon. New York: Harcourt, Brace & Company, 1936. It retroactively received the Newbery Honor award for the year 1937.
 Charles Sheeler: Artist in the American Tradition. New York: Harcourt, Brace & Company, 1938.
 The Roots of American Culture, edited by Van Wyck Brooks. New York: Harcourt, Brace & World, 1942.

References

Further reading

Michael Denning. The Cultural Front: The Laboring of American Culture in the Twentieth Century. New York: Verso, 1998. (Second Edition. New York: Verso Books, 2011.)

Joan Shelley Rubin. Constance Rourke and American Culture. Chapel Hill: North Carolina Press, 1980.

Andrew Kelly.  "Kentucky by Design: The Decorative Arts and American Culture". Lexington: University Press of Kentucky. 2015.

External links
 Index of American Design
 Michigan Women's Historical Center & Hall of Fame Entry
 

Vassar College alumni
University of Paris alumni
Vassar College faculty
Newbery Honor winners
1885 births
1941 deaths
American women historians
20th-century American historians
20th-century American women writers
Accidental deaths from falls
Accidental deaths in Michigan
Writers from Cleveland
Historians from Ohio
American expatriates in France